In mathematics, the Ihara zeta function is a zeta function associated with a finite graph. It closely resembles the Selberg zeta function, and is used to relate closed walks to the spectrum of the adjacency matrix. The Ihara zeta function was first defined by Yasutaka Ihara in the 1960s in the context of discrete subgroups of the two-by-two p-adic special linear group. Jean-Pierre Serre suggested in his book Trees that Ihara's original definition can be reinterpreted graph-theoretically. It was Toshikazu Sunada who put this suggestion into practice in 1985. As observed by Sunada, a regular graph is a Ramanujan graph if and only if its Ihara zeta function satisfies an analogue of the Riemann hypothesis.

Definition
The Ihara zeta function is defined as the analytic continuation of the infinite product

The product in the definition is taken over all prime closed geodesics  of the graph , where geodesics which differ by a cyclic rotation are considered equal.

The closed geodesic  is prime if it cannot be obtained by repeating a closed geodesic  times, for an integer .

This graph-theoretic formulation is due to Sunada.

Ihara's formula
Ihara (and Sunada in the graph-theoretic setting) showed that for regular graphs the zeta function is a rational function.
If  is a -regular graph with adjacency matrix  then

If  is connected and has  vertices, .

The Ihara zeta-function is in fact always the reciprocal of a graph polynomial:

where  is Ki-ichiro Hashimoto's edge adjacency operator. Hyman Bass gave a determinant formula involving the adjacency operator.

Applications
The Ihara zeta function plays an important role in the study of free groups, spectral graph theory, and dynamical systems, especially symbolic dynamics, where the Ihara zeta function is an example of a Ruelle zeta function.

References 

 
 
 
 
 
 

Zeta and L-functions
Algebraic graph theory